The Kalix archipelago is a group of 792 Swedish islands in the north part of the Bay of Bothnia. The largest island in the Kalix archipelago is Rånön. A few of the islands have small permanent populations, but most are used only for recreation in the summer months. They are icebound during the winter.

Location

The north of the bay of Bothnia contains a large archipelago area.
The islands in the Swedish sector make up the Norrbotten archipelago.
It is divided into the archipelagos of Piteå (550 islands), Luleå (1,312 islands), Kalix (792 islands) and Haparanda (652 islands).
As a result, the islands are growing in size but the waters and harbors are becoming shallower.

The largest island in the Kalix archipelago, and in the Norbotten archipelago as a whole, is Rånön.
It is the only island in Kalix that once had a resident population, who lived from forestry, fishing and farming.
Traces can still be seen.
Stora Huvön is said to be one of the most beautiful islands in Sweden, with cliffs that rise from the sea, a sandy beach, and deep tree-filled valleys.
Malören, in the outer archipelago, has a chapel that dates to the 1770s.
Some of other islands include Bergön, Berghamn, Björn, Getskär-Renskär, Halsön, Granön, Likskär and Stora Trutskär.

Climate

The waters around the archipelago are brackish, with less the 10% of the salt content of the Atlantic.
The sea freezes in January and remain frozen until March–April.

See also
List of islands of the Kalix archipelago

References
Citations

Sources

Swedish islands in the Baltic
Archipelagoes of Sweden
Landforms of Norrbotten County
Kalix